Help Wanted – Male is a 1920 American silent comedy film directed by Henry King and starring Blanche Sweet, Henry King, and Frank Leigh.

Plot

Cast

See also
Blanche Sweet filmography

References

Bibliography
 Donald W. McCaffrey & Christopher P. Jacobs. Guide to the Silent Years of American Cinema. Greenwood Publishing, 1999.

External links

1920 films
1920 comedy films
Silent American comedy films
Films directed by Henry King
American silent feature films
1920s English-language films
American black-and-white films
Pathé Exchange films
Films with screenplays by George H. Plympton
1920s American films